Margoliouth is a surname. Notable people by that name include:

 David Samuel Margoliouth (1858–1940), British orientalist. 
 Moses Margoliouth (1820–1881), Jewish convert to Christianity.
 H. M. Margoliouth (1887–1959), British poet and literary scholar.
 Jessie Payne Margoliouth (1856–1933), Syriac scholar.